Ritchie Blackmore's Rainbow (sometimes stylised Ritchie Blackmore's R-A-I-N-B-O-W) is the debut studio album by American/British rock band Rainbow, released in 1975.

Recording
During studio sessions in Tampa Bay, Florida on 12 December 1974, Blackmore originally planned to record the solo single "Black Sheep of the Family"- a cover of a track by the band Quatermass from 1970 – and the newly composed "Sixteenth Century Greensleeves", which was to be the B-side.
Other musicians involved included singer/lyricist Ronnie James Dio and drummer Gary Driscoll of blues rock band Elf, and cellist Hugh McDowell of ELO. Satisfied with the two tracks, Blackmore decided to extend the sessions to a full album.

The other members of Elf, keyboardist Micky Lee Soule and bassist Craig Gruber, were used for the recording of the album in Musicland Studios in Munich, West Germany during February and March, 1975. Though it was originally planned to be a solo album, the record was billed as Ritchie Blackmore's Rainbow, and later progressed as a new band project. Blackmore and Dio did promotional work for the album. Shortly after the album was released, Soule quit the band, while Gruber and Driscoll were sacked. This first line-up never performed live, and the live photos used in the album art are of Blackmore while with Deep Purple and of Elf playing live.

The last track of the album, "Still I'm Sad", is an instrumental cover of a song by the Yardbirds from their 1965 album Having a Rave Up with the Yardbirds. A version featuring vocals subsequently appeared on Rainbow's live album On Stage and their 1995 studio album Stranger in Us All.

Release
The original vinyl release had a gate-fold sleeve, although the later budget re-issue on Polydor was reduced to a single sleeve. On the cassette version of the album, Side One features the last five tracks, while Side Two plays the first four. On the case insert and on the cassette itself, "Sixteenth Century Greensleeves" is written as "Sixteen Century Greensleeves".

Ritchie Blackmore's Rainbow was re-issued on CD in re-mastered form in the US in April 1999. The European release followed later in the year.

Vocalist Ronnie James Dio considered this release his favourite Rainbow album.

Despite the title implying the record being a Ritchie Blackmore solo release, in later years Blackmore has jokingly stated that Dio's contributions warranted a re-titling of "Ritchie Blackmore and Ronnie James Dio's Rainbow".

Reception

The album was praised in British contemporary reviews for its fantasy/heroic-like lyrical content and the innovative rock style. However, the reviewer for the American magazine Rolling Stone disparaged the album, describing Blackmore's playing "listless and bored in relation to past performances" and the band "a completely anonymous group."

Modern reviews have a similar tenor. AllMusic reviewer wrote that the album have "a few listenable tracks", with young Dio "at his best when he fully gives in to his own and Blackmore's medieval fantasy leanings in hard-rocking tracks like 'Sixteenth Century Greensleeves' and 'Man on the Silver Mountain'", but remarked how the band became "a true embarrassment when they try to lighten up and boogie down." Canadian journalist Martin Popoff noticed that on this album Blackmore "confirms the creative vacuum that was much in evidence towards his last years with Purple", offering a "boring, dated, diluted and largely illogical smorgasbord of guitar rock stylings, all inespressively played over". He also criticized Martin Birch's dull and inexpensive production, "which ruins what is already a limp noodle of a record" and saved only the songs "Man on the Silver Mountain" and "Sixteenth Century Greensleeves", "which approach the worthiness of Rising".

Covers
The album's songs have been performed by subsequent Rainbow line-ups and covered by other bands.

 Rainbow included an updated version of "Still I'm Sad" on their 1995 album Stranger in Us All.
 Blackmore's Night have released a folk rock cover version of "Self Portrait" on their second studio album Under a Violet Moon in 1999, and "Temple of the King" on 2013's Dancer and the Moon. They also performed a live cover of "Sixteenth Century Greensleeves" (titled as "16th Century Greensleeves") on their 2002 live album Past Times with Good Company.
 German heavy metal band Angel Dust covered "The Temple of the King" on the tribute album Holy Dio: Tribute to Ronnie James Dio.
 German rock group Scorpions covered "The Temple of the King" on the tribute album Ronnie James Dio - This Is Your Life.
 Spanish Folk Metal band Mägo de Oz covered "The Temple of the King" on their third album La Leyenda de la Mancha with lyrics in Spanish and changing the title to "El Templo del Adiós"

Track listing
All songs written by Ritchie Blackmore and Ronnie James Dio except where noted.

Personnel
Rainbow
Ronnie James Dio – lead vocals, producer
Ritchie Blackmore – guitar, producer
Micky Lee Soule – piano, mellotron, clavinet, organ
Craig Gruber – bass
Gary Driscoll – drums

Additional musicians
Shoshana – backing vocals on "Catch the Rainbow" and "Still I'm Sad"

Production
Martin Birch – producer, engineer, mixing

Charts
Album

Certifications

References

1975 debut albums
Rainbow (rock band) albums
Polydor Records albums
Albums produced by Martin Birch